Martin Lundberg (born June 7, 1990 in Skellefteå, Sweden) is a Swedish professional ice hockey player, currently playing with the Växjö Lakers in the Swedish Hockey League (SHL).

Playing career 
Born and bred in Skellefteå, Lundberg came through the youth ranks of local club Skellefteå AIK and logged his first minutes in the country's top-tier Swedish Hockey League (SHL) during the 2007–08 season. He became a regular on Skellefteå's senior squad the following season. In 2013 and 2014, he won the SHL championship with the club and lost in the finals in 2011, 2012, 2015 and 2016.

On May 24, 2016, he was handed a one-year contract by the Chicago Blackhawks of the National Hockey League (NHL). After attending the Blackhawks 2016 training camp, Lundberg was re-assigned to American Hockey League affiliate, the Rockford IceHogs on October 3, 2016. In the 2016–17 season with the IceHogs, Lundberg contributed his physical presence with 9 goals and 21 points in 67 games while being unable to earn a recall to the NHL with Chicago.

As an impending free agent, Lundberg opted to return to Sweden in agreeing to a two-year contract with Växjö Lakers of the SHL on May 5, 2017.

Career statistics

Regular season and playoffs

International

Awards and honours

References

External links 

1990 births
Living people
Rockford IceHogs (AHL) players
Skellefteå AIK players
Swedish ice hockey centres
People from Skellefteå Municipality
Växjö Lakers players
Sportspeople from Västerbotten County